Magnum, P.I. is an American action drama television series developed by Peter M. Lenkov and Eric Guggenheim. It stars Jay Hernandez as Thomas Magnum, a private investigator and former Navy SEAL who solves crimes in Hawaii. It is a reboot of the series of the same name created by Donald P. Bellisario and Glen A. Larson, which aired from 1980 to 1988. The series co-stars Perdita Weeks, Zachary Knighton, Stephen Hill, Amy Hill, and Tim Kang.

Series overview

Episodes

Season 1 (2018–19)

Season 2 (2019–20)

Season 3 (2020–21)

Season 4 (2021–22)

Season 5 (2023)

Ratings

References